Sergio Sartorelli (Alessandria, 7 May 1928 – Torino, 28 November 2009) was a noted Italian automotive designer and engineer.

During his career at Carrozzeria Ghia, OSI, and finally Fiat, Sartorelli became widely known for his work on the Fiat 2300 S Coupé, Karmann Ghia Type 34, and the Fiat 126.

He was the honorary president of the Italian Volkswagen Karmann Ghia Club.

Background
As a young teen, Sartorelli had a passion for cars, trucks, trains, and even military vehicles. To mentally escape the depth of World War II, he spent his time filling school notebooks with sketches and building scale wooden models of cars.

After the war he earned a degree in mechanical engineering at the Polytechnic University of Turin in 1954, followed by 18 months of Military Service in as a cartographer. During his military service, he continued to sketch for Carrozzeria Boano.

After his military service, he was turned down by Boano and Pininfarina, but in 1956 was hired by Ing. Giovanni Savonuzzi at Ghia.

Career
Sergio Sartorelli's career at Ghia rose quickly when in 1957, engineer Savonuzzi left Ghia for Chrysler, Sartorelli became Head of the Style Prototypes. After the sudden death of Luigi Segre, owner and chief stylist of Carrozzeria Ghia, Sartorelli left Ghia.

Officine Stampaggi Industriali (OSI) was set up as a parallel and complementary company to Ghia and it was part owned by Luigi Segre. With the death of Segre the partnership disappeared and OSI was left with no styling department. After two years of a freelance relationship with Michelotti, OSI set up its own styling department called Centro Stile e Esperienze OSI, and appointed Sergio Sartorelli as its director. This arrangement lasted from 1965 until December 1967 when OSI reorganized.

In 1968 what was left of Centro Stile e Esperienze OSI, became the Future Studies department at Centro Stile Fiat with Sergio Sartorelli as its head, it was entrusted with the study of design, automotive development, and modeling of prototypes for Fiat.

By 1984 with the car market in crisis, Fiat let Sergio Sartorelli go, and he retired from his design career.

Design work
Sergio Sartorelli's design work included:

References

External links
Sergio Sartorelli Karmann Ghia Italy Club - English Translation
Sergio Sartorelli Karmann Komment - The official Magazine of the Karmann Ghia Owners Club GB

Italian automobile designers
1928 births
2009 deaths